Massimiliano Smeriglio (born 8 May 1966 in Rome) is an Italian politician, writer, University professor, and a Member of the European Parliament.

In 2006 he was elected to the Chamber of Deputies on the PRC list. He was re-elected in 2013, among the ranks of SEL, but he gave up the seat in the Chamber of Deputies to serve as Vice-president of the Lazio region in the government led by Nicola Zingaretti.

European Parliament 

In the 2019 European Parliament election Smeriglio was elected as a Member of the European Parliament on the Democratic Party list, as a member of Futura political association headed by Laura Boldrini. He has since been serving on the Committee on Culture and Education and on the Committee on Petitions.

Smeriglio voted against the European Parliament resolution of 23 November 2022 on recognising the Russian Federation as a state sponsor of terrorism.

References

Living people
1966 births
MEPs for Italy 2019–2024
Democratic Party (Italy) MEPs
Democratic Party (Italy) politicians
Left Ecology Freedom politicians
Communist Refoundation Party politicians
Politicians from Rome